David E. Evans was born in 1950 at Glanamman, Dyfed, Wales. He is a professor of mathematics at Cardiff University, specialising in knot theory. He has published a number of books, many in collaboration with Yasuyuki Kawahigashi. 

He studied at New College, Oxford and Jesus College, Oxford. 

From 1975 to 1976 Evans worked as a scholar and Research Assistant in the department of Theoretical Physics at the Dublin Institute for Advanced Studies. Over the next few years he travelled around the world working as a research fellow at UCLA (1977); Australian National University, Canberra (1982, 1989); Kyoto University (1982-83, 1985); and the University of Ottawa (1983). Between 1987 and 1998 he worked as a professor at Swansea, Wales. Since 1998, he has worked as a professor at Cardiff University.

Awards and Honours 

 Junior Mathematical Prize, 1972 
 Senior Mathematical Prize, 1975
 Johnson Prizes, 1975
 Whitehead Prize – London Mathematical Society, 1989.

Notable published works
Quantum Symmetries on Operator Algebras (David E. Evans and Yasuyuki Kawahigashi, published 21 May 1998) One of the first books to examine post-1981 combinatorial-algebraic developments with respect to operator algebras.  Intended for an audience of graduate students and researchers of the field.
Integrable lattice models for conjugate A^(1)_n (David E. Evans and R. E. Behrend, published 2004 in J. Phys. A) Evans's most recently published paper.

References

External links
 Homepage
 

1950 births
20th-century British mathematicians
21st-century British mathematicians
Alumni of New College, Oxford
Alumni of Jesus College, Oxford
Whitehead Prize winners
Academics of Cardiff University
Living people
People from Glanamman

Academics of the Dublin Institute for Advanced Studies